Sperone Westwater is a contemporary art gallery in the Bowery, in Manhattan, in New York City. The partners are Angela Westwater and Gian Enzo Sperone. The gallery was started on Greene Street in Soho in 1975; the first show was of work by Carl André. Since 2010 it has occupied a building on Bowery purpose-built to designs by Foster + Partners.
 In 2008 the gallery inaugurated a second venue at Chasa dal Guvernatur in Sent, Switzerland, with an exhibition of Bruce Nauman.

Artists
Sperone Westwater represents many contemporary artists, including:
 Carla Accardi
 Bertozzi & Casoni
 Alighiero Boetti
 Joana Choumali (since 2022)
 Wim Delvoye 
 Kim Dingle
 Lucio Fontana
 Shaunte Gates
 Jitish Kallat
 Guillermo Kuitca
 Wolfgang Laib
 Helmut Lang
 Amy Lincoln
 Richard Long
 Emil Lukas
 David Lynch
 Heinz Mack
 Piero Manzoni
 Mario Merz
 Frank Moore
 Katy Moran
 Bruce Nauman 
 Otto Piene
 Alexis Rockman
 Susan Rothenberg
 Tom Sachs
 Peter Sacks
 Andrew Sendor
 Not Vital
 William Wegman

Sperone Westwater has in the past represented Julian Schnabel

References

Art museums and galleries in Manhattan
1975 establishments in New York City
Contemporary art galleries in the United States
Contemporary art galleries in Switzerland